Northwood is an older residential area of Hanley, Stoke-on-Trent. It is home to Northwood Stadium, the ground of City of Stoke Athletics Club.

References

Areas of Stoke-on-Trent